Dharma Field Zen Center (Dharma Field Meditation and Learning Center) is a Zen Buddhist community that offers daily meditation, sesshins, Sunday morning Dharma talks, and a large web archive.

A multi-year curriculum explores the foundation studies of Buddha, Nagarjuna, Dōgen, and the wisdom teachings of the Mahayana.

Head teacher Steve Hagen and Dharma teacher Norm Randolph are Dharma heirs of Dainin Katagiri. Former head teacher Bev Forsman and former Dharma teacher Lee Register are Dharma heirs of Steve Hagen.

Dharma Field is located in the former St. Andrew's Lutheran Church in Minneapolis, Minnesota.

Gallery

Notes

See also
Buddhism in the United States

External links

Dharma Field

Religious organizations established in 1997
Buddhism in Minnesota
Zen centers in the United States
Religious buildings and structures in Minneapolis